Dylan Tavares dos Santos (born 30 August 1996) is a professional footballer who plays as a left-back for  club Bastia. Born in Switzerland, he plays for the Cape Verde national team.

Club career
On 23 July 2021, Tavares joined Xamax on a one-year contract.

On 29 May 2022, he agreed to join Bastia in France for the 2022–23 season.

International career
Furtado was born in Switzerland and is of Cape Verdean descent. He was called up to the represent the Cape Verde for a set of friendlies in October 2020. He debuted for Cape Verde in a 2–1 friendly win over Andorra on 7 October 2020.
He was named in the roster for the 2021 Africa cup of nations when the team reached the round of 16.

Career statistics
Scores and results list Cape Verde's goal tally first, score column indicates score after each Tavares goal.

References

External links

SFL Profile

1996 births
Living people
Swiss people of Cape Verdean descent
Footballers from Geneva
Swiss sportspeople of African descent
Cape Verdean footballers
Swiss men's footballers
Association football fullbacks
Cape Verde international footballers
2021 Africa Cup of Nations players
Étoile Carouge FC players
FC Stade Nyonnais players
Servette FC players
Yverdon-Sport FC players
FC Stade Lausanne Ouchy players
Neuchâtel Xamax FCS players
SC Bastia players
Swiss Challenge League players
Swiss Promotion League players
2. Liga Interregional players
Cape Verdean expatriate footballers
Cape Verdean expatriate sportspeople in Switzerland
Expatriate footballers in Switzerland
Cape Verdean expatriate sportspeople in France
Expatriate footballers in France